The Tribhuvan Challenge Shield is Nepal's second oldest association football tournament, founded in 1948 by King Tribhuvan.

History
In 1947 (2004 BS), Tribhuvan Challenge Shield was introduced by late H. M. King Tribhuvan for the development of this football game which was organized at Tudikhel in front of Haribhavan. In that tournament Naresh XI led by Nar Shumsher secured first position and N. R. T. team secured second position. In the same year Shree 3 Padma Shumsher introduced the Ram Janaki cup which was continuously won thrice by Police Force team. The same cup was again introduced but was renamed as Martyr's Memorial league football and hence League matches were introduced in Nepal.

In the year 1951 (2008 BS), Tribhuvan Challenge Shield knock-out football tournament was organized in which the team of Jaleshwor-11 bagged the shield. Police force team secured 1st position and N. R. T. second in the Marty's Memorial League tournament organized in the same year. Balsakha Dal introduced a new shield called Devi Maya Memorial Shield in the year 1952 (2009 BS) and in 1953 (2010 BS) Sankata Boys Sports team won the shield. Other tournaments of football were played in Singh Durbar itself up to the year 1953 (2010 BS). Although the construction of Dasharath Stadium had started just before the coronation of H. M. King Mahendra but football match was played there too on the occasion of coronation of H. M. King Mahendra.

Dasarath Rangasala tragedy

On 12 March 1988, at least 93 people were killed and 100 more injured in a stadium crush at Dasarath Rangasala Stadium in Kathmandu, Nepal. The Tribhuvan Challenge Shield Cup match, between a team from Kathmandu and one from Bangladesh drew 30,000 fans. However the events spiralled out of control when a storm broke over the city, bringing lightning, 50-mph wind and hailstones.

Nepal often experiences significant hailstorms during early spring, but the stadium only had one covered grandstand. Spectators panicked in their efforts to escape the pelting hail, and rushed to the sheltered west stand. When police pushed them back, they turned toward the exits. All but one of the stadium's eight exits were locked, and witnesses reported that most of the deaths occurred there as fans found the other gates closed.

Table

*Thimpu refused to participate in penalty shoot-out

See also
Football in Nepal
All Nepal Football Association

References

External links
Nepal football history

 

Football competitions in Nepal
1948 establishments in Nepal